Anthony J. "Ank" Scanlan (c. 1903 – February 13, 1965) was an American football coach. He served as the head football coach at the College of the Holy Cross in Worcester, Massachusetts from 1942 to 1944, compiling a record of 16–8–3. Before he was hired at Holy Cross in December 1941, Scanlan was the head football coach for 14 years, from 1928 to 1941, at St. Joseph's Preparatory School in Philadelphia, tallying a mark of 93–14–10. He played college football as a halfback at Saint Joseph's College—now known as Saint Joseph's University—in Philadelphia under head coach Heinie Miller before graduating in 1924.

Scalan died at the age of 63, on February 13, 1965, at his home in Philadelphia.

Head coaching record

College

References

1900s births
1995 deaths
American football halfbacks
Holy Cross Crusaders football coaches
Saint Joseph's Hawks football players
High school football coaches in Pennsylvania
Sportspeople from Pennsylvania